The 1942 Copa Aldao was the final match to decide the winner of the Copa Aldao, the 15th. edition of the international competition organised by the Argentine and Uruguayan Associations together. The final was contested by Uruguayan club Nacional and Argentine side River Plate.

In the first match, played at Estadio Centenario in Montevideo, National beat River Plate with a conclusive 4–0 win. The second leg should have been played at San Lorenzo de Almagro Stadium in Buenos Aires, but it was never held therefore the title was not officially awarded to any team.

Qualified teams

Match details

First leg

Second leg 

As the second leg was not held, no champion was proclaimed.

References

1942 in Argentine football
1942 in Uruguayan football
Club Nacional de Football matches
Club Atlético River Plate matches
Football in Buenos Aires
Football in Montevideo